Stuart Kingsley Gears Whiffen (3 December 1950 – 15 December 2006) was a Welsh amateur footballer who made one appearance in the Football League for Chelsea as a goalkeeper. He was aged 16 years and 157 days on his only Chelsea appearance, making him the club's second youngest player of all time after Ian Hamilton, who was 16 years and 138 days on his debut earlier that year. Whiffen won caps for Wales at schoolboy level.

Personal life 
Whiffen went to school in Llanfair Caereinion. In his later life he lived in Dorset and was a keen golfer, a competition is held in his memory.

References

People from Welshpool
Sportspeople from Powys
Welsh footballers
Association football goalkeepers
Chelsea F.C. players
English Football League players
1950 births
2006 deaths
Bangor City F.C. players
Wales schools international footballers